Thomas Hugh Wade (2 March 1894 – 27 November 1939) was an Australian rules footballer who played with Essendon in the Victorian Football League (VFL).

Notes

External links 
		

1894 births
1939 deaths
Australian rules footballers from Victoria (Australia)
Essendon Football Club players
Hawthorn Football Club (VFA) players
Australian military personnel of World War I